Linus Werneman (born June 4, 1992) is a Swedish professional ice hockey player. A smallish very strong winger with good speed and impressive technical skills. Really noticeable on the ice with his creativity. 
Has a really hard shot and potential to become a pretty high scoring player.
Works pretty hard too and does not ignore his defensive responsibilities. 
Played Elitserien for Timrå IK as a junior and scored twice against Djurgårdens IF.

References

External links

1992 births
Living people
Swedish ice hockey forwards
Timrå IK players
People from Luleå
Sportspeople from Norrbotten County